It was a Geto-Dacian fortified town.

References

Dacian fortresses in Constanța County